USS Garcia (FF-1040) was the lead ship of her class of destroyer escort ships, later reclassified as frigates, in the United States Navy. She was named for U.S. Marine Private First Class Fernando Luis Garcia, the first Puerto Rican Medal of Honor Recipient.

Laid down on 16 October 1962 by Bethlehem Steel of San Francisco, California, Garcia was launched on 31 October 1963 and commissioned on 21 December 1964. Originally designated DE-1040, she was redesignated FF-1040 in 1975 as part of the Navy's 1975 ship reclassification.

She served in the Atlantic Fleet and was homeported in Newport, Rhode Island, and Charleston, South Carolina.

Pakistan service

Following her decommissioning on 31 January 1989, she was transferred to Pakistan on the same day. Renamed Saif, she was returned to the United States on 13 January 1994 and was then sold for scrap on 29 March 1994.

Awards, Citations and Campaign Ribbons

References 
 K. Jack Bauer and Stephen S. Roberts, "Register of Ships of the U. S. Navy, 1775-1990," p. 243.
 Naval Institute "Proceedings," May 1995, pp. 219, 220.

External links
USS Garcia on NavSource Online: Destroyer Escort Photo Archive
Photo of Garcia

 

Garcia-class frigates
Ships built in San Francisco
1963 ships
Cold War frigates and destroyer escorts of the United States
Ships transferred from the United States Navy to the Pakistan Navy
Garcia-class frigates of the Pakistan Navy
Bethlehem Steel